Yasnaya Polyana is a rural locality (a settlement) in Toykinskoye Rural Settlement, Bolshesosnovsky District, Perm Krai, Russia. The population was 7 as of 2010. There is 1 street.

Geography 
It is located 2.5 km east from Toykino.

References 

Rural localities in Bolshesosnovsky District